Chalybea macrocarpa is a species of plant in the family Melastomataceae. It is endemic to Boyacá Department in Colombia.

References

macrocarpa
Endangered plants
Endemic flora of Colombia
Taxonomy articles created by Polbot